The 2002 NCAA Division II Men's Lacrosse Championship was the 18th annual tournament to determine the national champions of NCAA Division II men's college lacrosse in the United States.

The final was played at Yurcak Field at Rutgers University in Piscataway, New Jersey. 

Limestone defeated NYIT in the championship game, 11–9, to claim the Saints' second Division II national title.

Bracket

See also
2002 NCAA Division II Women's Lacrosse Championship
2002 NCAA Division I Men's Lacrosse Championship
2002 NCAA Division III Men's Lacrosse Championship

References

NCAA Division II Men's Lacrosse Championship
NCAA Division II Men's Lacrosse Championship
NCAA Division II Men's Lacrosse